Dai-Keong Lee (September 2, 1915 – December 1, 2005) was an American composer. His Symphony No. 2 was runner up for the 1952 Pulitzer Prize for Music.

He was born in Honolulu, Hawaii, and studied with Roger Sessions at Princeton University, Frederick Jacobi at the Juilliard School of Music, Otto Luening at Columbia University, and Aaron Copland.

He worked as a freelance composer in New York City. He composed six operas, the music for the Broadway comedy Teahouse of the August Moon, a ballet, a ballet suite, two symphonies, a Polynesian suite, a dance piece and a concerto grosso for strings, a string quartet, orchestral songs, choral works, and piano pieces. Joan Field premiered his violin concerto.

Sources

American male composers
Writers from Honolulu
Musicians from Honolulu
Princeton University alumni
Juilliard School alumni
Columbia University alumni
American musicians of Chinese descent
1915 births
2005 deaths
20th-century American composers
20th-century American male musicians